Ageratum houstonianum, commonly known as flossflower, bluemink, blueweed, pussy foot or Mexican paintbrush, is a cool-season annual plant often grown as bedding in gardens.

Description
The flower heads are borne in dense corymbs. The ray flowers are threadlike and fluff-haired, leading to the common name. The narrow lanceolate bracts are pointed, denticulate only at the top and glandular hairy. The flowering period is from May to November in the northern hemisphere. The plant attracts butterflies.

Range
The plant is native to Central America in Guatemala and Belize, and adjacent parts of Mexico, but has become an invasive weed in other areas. It was also naturalized in large parts of the tropics and in the southern United States.

Today, it is widely used as an ornamental plant for summer borders and balcony boxes, high varieties also as cut flowers. The species is cultivated once a year, having numerous varieties whose crowns may be dark blue, purple, pink and white.

Chemistry
Ageratum has evolved a unique method of protecting itself from insects: it produces a methoprene-like compound which interferes with the normal function of the corpus allatum, the organ responsible for secreting juvenile hormone during insect growth and development. This chemical triggers the next molting cycle to prematurely develop adult structures, and can render most insects sterile if ingested in large enough quantities.

Toxicity
Ageratum houstonianum is toxic to grazing animals, causing liver lesions. It contains pyrrolizidine alkaloids.

Weed risk
Ageratum houstonianum is prone to becoming a rampant environmental weed when grown outside of its natural range. It has become an invasive weed in the United States, Australia, Europe, Africa, China, Japan, New Zealand, and the Philippines.

Varieties

Ageratum houstonianum var. angustatum B.L. Rob.
Ageratum houstonianum f. isochroum
Ageratum houstonianum f. luteum
Ageratum houstonianum var. muticescens
Ageratum houstonianum f. niveum
Ageratum houstonianum f. normale
Ageratum houstonianum var. typicum
Ageratum houstonianum f. versicolor

The cultivars 'Blue Danube' and 'Blue Horizon' have gained the Royal Horticultural Society's Award of Garden Merit.

References

External links
 
 

houstonianum
Annual plants
Flora of Central America
Flora of Mexico
Garden plants of North America
Garden plants of Central America
Taxa named by Philip Miller